GT1 may refer to
FIA GT1 World Championship
Gran Turismo (1997 video game)
Group GT1, a top-line category in GT racing 1993–1998 (known as "GTS" between 2000–2004), revived 2005-2011
Toyota GT-One, competed in the above category
Porsche 911 GT1, competed in the above category
GT-1 (missile), a World War II glide torpedo
Gemini 1 (Gemini-Titan 1, or GT-1), an uncrewed Project Gemini mission
Tweed GT-1, glider